Reduction of Hours of Work (Textiles) Convention, 1937 is  an International Labour Organization Convention.

It was established in 1937:
Considering that the question of the reduction of hours of work in the textile industry is the second item on the agenda of the Session;

Confirming the principle laid down in the Forty-Hour Week Convention, 1935, including the maintenance of the standard of living;

Considering it to be desirable that this principle should be applied by international agreement to the textile industry;...

Withdrawn
The convention was never brought into force, and was withdrawn at the ILO General Conference May 30, 2000.

Ratifications
No countries ratified this convention.

External links 
Text.

International Labour Organization conventions
Working time
Treaties concluded in 1937
Unratified treaties
History of the textile industry
1937 in labor relations